The Catholic church in Denmark (where the state church is Lutheran) and its overseas territories has no ecclesiastical province nor belongs to any (all sees being exempt, i.e. directly subject to the Holy See), nor has a national episcopal conference, but the -entirely Latin- Danish episcopate partakes in the Episcopal conference of Scandinavia. It comprises only :

 the only proper see, a full bishopric in the national capital 
 two missionary pre-diocesan territorial prelatures.

The Eastern Catholics are pastorally served by a transnational apostolic exarchate from Germany.

There formally is also an Apostolic Nunciature to Denmark, as papal embassy-level diplomatic representation. However, it is vested in the Apostolic Nunciature to Sweden (in Djursholm), as are the nunciatures to Norway, Finland and Iceland, covering the Nordic countries.

Current jurisdictions

Latin jurisdiction 
 Roman Catholic Diocese of Copenhagen (København), which also covers overseas the Faroe Islands (European Atlantic) and (in North America) Greenland

Eastern Catholic jurisdiction 
Ukrainian Catholic Church (Byzantine rite in Ukrainian language)

 Ukrainian Catholic Apostolic Exarchate in Germany and Scandinavia, also covering Germany (with the see in Münich), Finland, Norway and Sweden

Defunct jurisdictions 
(all Latin)

Titular sees 
Titular bishoprics only

in Denmark proper
 Diocese of Roskilde (suppressed again, even as titular bishopric)

overseas
 Diocese of Gardar (Garðar) on Greenland

Other Pre-Reformation  
Denmark proper
 Diocese of Aarhus (Århus)
 Diocese of Børglum
 Diocese of Odense
 Diocese of Ribe
 Diocese of Schleswig (mainly in present Germany; absorbed by Osnabrück)
 Diocese of Viborg (Vestervig)

overseas territories
 Ancient Diocese of the Faroe Islands

Post-Reformation 
Only direct precursors of the current sees.

See also 
  list of Catholic dioceses (structured view)

Sources and external links 
 GCatholic - data for all sections

Lists of Roman Catholic dioceses by country
Catholic dioceses